Ashley Davenport (February 12, 1794 – February 10, 1874) was an American farmer, merchant, county judge, high sheriff, and politician from New York.

Life
Davenport was born in Copenhagen, New York. He was a member of the New York State Senate (21st D.) in 1852 and 1853. Davenport also held the positions of county judge and high sheriff for Lewis County, New York.

Sources
 The New York Civil List compiled by Franklin Benjamin Hough (pp. 137 and 140; Weed, Parsons and Co., 1858)
 American Biographical Notes by Franklin B. Hough (p. 99)

1794 births
1874 deaths
19th-century American politicians
Democratic Party New York (state) state senators
People from Lewis County, New York